Elena Paparazzo (born 11 May 1973) is an Italian former basketball player who competed in the 1992 Summer Olympics and in the 1996 Summer Olympics.

References

1973 births
Living people
Italian women's basketball players
Olympic basketball players of Italy
Basketball players at the 1992 Summer Olympics
Basketball players at the 1996 Summer Olympics